The High School Democrats of America (HSDA) is a student-led organization that seeks to mobilize young people and elect Democrats. HSDA student activists across the country engage in political activity and advance the agenda of the Democratic Party.

Formerly part of the Young Democrats of America, HSDA represents high school students at all levels of the Democratic Party.

History 

Although individual unaffiliated state chapters existed long beforehand, the High School Democrats of America itself was founded in December 2005, by Ahmed Kokon (NY) and Jonathan Padilla (CA), with Eddy Foster (PA) and Alicia Froio (PA) joining the board after the initial election. In June 2014, the High School Democrats of America formally ended its affiliation with the Young Democrats of America, and ceased functioning as the Young Democrats of America's High School Caucus. With the change, the position of National Parliamentarian became Development Director. The Development Director served as Parliamentarian and resolved disputes and presided over elections. The organization held its first national conference, the HSDA Strategic Summit, in Washington, D.C., during July 2015. At the 2019 summer meeting of the Democratic National Committee in San Francisco, California, the party's Charter and Bylaws was amended to grant HSDA two seats on the DNC.

Organization 
The organization and rules governing HSDA are found in the organization's Official Bylaws.

The national organization presides over HSDA as a whole. It is led by the National Executive Board, which consists of the Chair, two Vice-Chairs of different genders, the Communications Director, the Programs Director, and the Development Director. The National E-Board is responsible for overseeing the organization, expanding HSDA, and working with states to promote Democratic causes. The National E-Board is elected every year by a ranked-choice election accessible to all members regardless of location. Leadership also includes a National Committee consisting of two representatives from individual states, territories, and the District of Columbia, in addition to Chairs and Vice Chairs from each Caucus. The Executive Board employs a group of volunteer staff, ranging from Financial Directors to Political Advisors. Other organizations at the national level include the Ethics Council, which resolves issues in an unbiased manner; the Caucuses, which represent marginalized communities of race, orientation, and disability; the Diversity Committee, which consists of the Chairs and Vice-Chairs of the Caucuses as well as the Diversity Director and promotes inclusivity; and the Adult Advisory Board, which assists the E-Board in legal and financial matters as well as long-term planning.

Each state organization works with all the local chapters in their state, and is responsible for connecting chapters, expanding HSDA, working on legislation, and promoting Democratic causes at the state level. State chapters also have an extensive list of accolades, including hosting a “Unity Day” with the Teen Age Republicans to promote bipartisanship. Each state holds its own elections to determine who assumes state leadership.

Local chapters at high schools and in communities work at a grassroots level by rallying young people behind causes. Local HSDA chapters have organized marches, registered voters, and helped to elect Democrats in their own communities.

Activities 
The organization is involved in a number of projects, including a Huffington Post blogging project and a separate publishing opportunity through The Progressive Teen, which serves as the official magazine of the organization with a full editorial staff. Both projects are aimed at inspiring political discourse and offering members the opportunity to voice their opinions about important civic issues in a highly-visible setting. The organization has also proved instrumental and necessary in several campaigns across the country, including the election of Joe Donnelly and Elizabeth Warren to the US Senate, as well as the notable election of President Barack H. Obama in 2008.
The organization has taken stances on important issues throughout the political spectrum, but has been recently focused on student loan reform, immigration reform, and gun control. After the Stoneman Douglas High School shooting in February 2018, HSDA members began to advocate for stronger gun control.

Since 2015, HSDA has hosted an annual summit in Washington, D.C., to train student activists and teach them to organize in their communities. HSDA has also garnered the attention of several notable politicians, including Sen. Cory Booker, Sen. Elizabeth Warren, Speaker of the House Nancy Pelosi, Rep. Alexandria Ocasio-Cortez, and President Joe Biden. In 2020, 2021, and 2022, the National Summit was virtual due to various reasons including the COVID-19 pandemic.

See also
 College Democrats
 College Democrats of America
 Democratic Party (United States)
 Law School Democrats of America
 Young Democrats of America
 Teen Age Republicans

Notes and references

External links
 High School Democrats of America Website
 The Progressive Teen

Democratic Party (United States) organizations
Factions in the Democratic Party (United States)
Youth-led organizations
Youth empowerment organizations
Youth wings of political parties in the United States
Political organizations established in 2005
Student organizations established in 2005
Student wings of political parties in the United States